George Henry Male Addison (1857–1922) was an Australian architect and artist.  Many of his buildings are now heritage-listed.

Early life
Addison was born on 23 March 1857 in Llanelly, Wales, the son of Edward James Addison (1820–1863), a Wesleyan minister and Jane Roswell née Male (1833–1860). His father undertook missionary work in West Africa but it damaged his health and he died in 1863 and Addison was raised by his maternal grandfather, Henry Male in Somerset. His sister, Emily Jane Addison (1855–?) worked as a governess to the family of Alexander McArthur in Brixton and, in 1834 married their son John Percival McArthur (1858–1901).

He was articled to architect Edmund Isles Hubbard at Rotherham and studied at the Royal Academy in London.

Addison immigrated to South Australia to work on a number of large government projects. After that, he moved to Melbourne and worked for the firm Terry and Oakden, later forming the firm Oakden, Addison and Kemp. There he was one of the founders of the Melbourne Art Society along with John Mather, Tom Roberts, Frederick McCubbin and other well-known artists.

In 1884 he married Emily Alice Maude with whom he had four children:
Lily Isabel Maude Addison (1885–1968)
Edward James Addison (1887–1956)
George Frederick Addison (1889–1985)
Edith May Addison (1892–?)

In 1889, Addison came to Brisbane to design the (former) London Chartered Bank of Australia building  on the corner of Queen and Creek Streets, Brisbane (demolished 1976). He liked the climate and decided to stay, working on his own. Later he went into partnership with his son George. His daughter Lily worked as a draftswoman and then architect in her father's firm; she was one of the earliest women to practice architecture in Australia.

Works
His works included:
 The Albert Street Uniting Church, Brisbane, built in 1888-89
 The villa Cliveden Mansions, built in 1888 at Spring Hill
 The villa Kirkston, built in 1888–89 at Windsor
 Extensive additions to the villa Stanley Hall at Clayfield, in 1889
 The Mansions, 40 George Street, Brisbane built in 1889.
 Fernbrook, his home in Indooroopilly built c. 1889. Fernbrook was eventually demolished in the 1920s and the University of Queensland silver-lead mine resides on the land.
 The villa Cumbooquepa, built in 1890 at South Brisbane, now part of Somerville House School
 The Old Museum Building, Brisbane, originally an exhibition building and concert hall built in 1891
 a religious building at All Hallows' School, a heritage-listed school at 547 Ann Street, Fortitude Valley, built in 1915
 buildings at the Eagle Farm Racecourse including the totaliser building, the ticket offices and the latrines, built around 1913-1914
 St Columba's Church, Wilston built in 1915 
 St Benedict's Catholic Church, 81 Mowbray Tce, East Brisbane built in 1917
 Sacred Heart Church, Rosalie built in 1918
 Blessed Oliver Plunkett Catholic Church, Cannon Hill in 1921

For a number of years, he was in a partnership with Leslie Corrie as Addison and Corrie. Together they designed many prominent Brisbane buildings, including:
 Trustees Chambers, a heritage-listed bank at 43 Queen Street, Brisbane built in about 1900

Later life
Addison was a chairman of the Brisbane Art Gallery.

Addison died on 6 February 1922 at the Mater Misericordiae Hospital, Brisbane. He was buried at the Toowong Cemetery.

References

Architects from Brisbane
1857 births
1922 deaths
GHM Addison buildings
Burials at Toowong Cemetery
People from Monmouthshire
Welsh emigrants to Australia
19th-century Australian architects
20th-century Australian architects